Jorge Luis Pallo is an American actor of Hispanic descent. He is known for his role as Marc Molina on The Secret Life of the American Teenager and for his appearance on Sabrina the Teenage Witch. He also appeared in Murder in Mexico: The Bruce Beresford-Redman Story and played Ignacio "Iggy" Loca on Syfy’s The Lost Room.

Early life 
Born Jorge Luis Christian Pallo in Queens, New York, he of Puerto Rican and Ecuadorian parentage. Pallo was raised by single mother and once aspiring singer Pat Pallo. Though his mother could never figure out how to pursue a career in the entertainment industry, she encouraged all of her children to pursue their dreams by enrolling them in extra-curricular activities such as guitar, theatre, and dance. Armed with this support, he made his debut in the middle school production of "The Nutcracker". He later starred in high school productions of "Into the Woods" and "A Funny Thing Happened on the Way to the Forum".

After high school, Pallo was accepted into the TISCH School of the Arts at NYU. During his junior year Pallo finally connected to what would be his future career while starring in The Hangar Theatre's Summer Stock production of "A Few Good Men," directed by his mentor Bob Moss. After receiving his BFA, Pallo starred in several off-Broadway productions and joined the latino sketch comedy group Vaso de Leche. A friend introduced him to his first manager who urged him to move to Los Angeles to further his career.

Professional career 
Pallo's move to LA was initially tumultuous, but he found solace while teaching acting classes at Scott Sedita Acting Studios. Kismet led Pallo to run into a fraternity brother, who was employed as a casting director, while playing a game of Texas Hold 'Em poker. This meeting allowed Pallo to work for six day's on his fraternity brother's film, which got his a SAG card.

Pallo also works as an acting coach in Los Angeles to young Hollywood talent.

Philanthropy 
Pallo is also active in the Big Brothers Big Sisters program, P.S. ARTS, and The Hollywood Heart Foundation. Pallo chose Hollywood Heart and Toys for Tots because they are two charities that are near to his heart because he believes "being of service matters." Pallo participates yearly in an annual cocktail party to gather toys for kids for Christmas.

Filmography

Film

Television

References

External links 

Living people
Male actors from New York City
American male film actors
American male television actors
Tisch School of the Arts alumni
People from Queens, New York
American people of Puerto Rican descent
Hispanic and Latino American male actors
1974 births